Quavo Huncho is the debut studio album by American rapper and Migos member Quavo. It was released on October 12, 2018, by Capitol Records, Motown, and Quality Control Music. The album features guest appearances from other fellow Migos members Takeoff and Offset, plus appearances from 21 Savage, Drake, Saweetie, Madonna, Cardi B, Lil Baby, Travis Scott, Normani, Davido, and Kid Cudi. The album was preceded by four singles: "Workin Me", "Lamb Talk", "Bubble Gum" and "Pass Out" featuring 21 Savage.

Critical reception

Quavo Huncho received generally mixed reviews from music critics. In one review, Neil Yeung of AllMusic believed Quavo Huncho "struggles to maintain momentum. Like many contemporaries, the album is overly bloated – designed for high streaming counts – and could use some trimming. With a mostly forgettable first half and a strong second half, sharper attention to editing could have made this a stronger album. Otherwise, Quavo Huncho is enjoyable but unmemorable. It's not quite a Migos album, but it comes close enough to tide fans over until album number four." Paul Thompson of Pitchfork concluded that Quavo Huncho is "flat and nearly anonymous", consisting of "passable, professional songs that are barely moving and pale when compared to nearly any full-length Migos record." Thompson added that the album is "so ordinary, so uniquely uninspiring that it makes it difficult to imagine a solo work from Quavo that would truly grip our attention." Kassandra Guagliardi of Exclaim! concluded that "By the end of the project, Quavo Huncho begins to feel more like a mixtape, with Quavo popping out to add a few unenergetic verses and repetitive adlibs rather than a strong solo debut. Quavo Hunchos individual features provide more of a draw than every solo track combined, proving that Quavo still needs some time to grow and develop as a solo artist." Thomas Hobbs of Highsnobiety complimented the album's production and guest appearances but criticised Quavo's performance and lyricism: "The reality could be that we're starting to suffer from Migos fatigue; the group's reliance on trap beats and repetitive, catchy hooks is starting to feel more and more one note. Quavo Huncho serves as a warning that the group must start to show more development in their sound or risk alienating rap fans, who might be getting bored with their sole formula."

Quavo admitted in a 2020 interview that he felt that he could have produced a better album: “I tried to club too much on my album, and I didn't give them nothing personal,” [...] "If I would've went a little personal, I think my album would have been a little bit better.”

Commercial performance
Quavo Huncho initially debuted at number 66 on the US Billboard 200 with sales from less than a day of activity. In its second week, the album ascended to number two the following week after a full week of tracking, which included 99,000 album-equivalent units (of which 6,000 came from pure album sales). In its third week, the album dropped to number eleven on the chart, earning an additional 40,000 units. In the fourth week, the album dropped to number 16 on the chart, earning another 27,000 units. On August 19, 2019, the album was certified gold by Recording Industry Association of America (RIAA) for combined sales and album-equivalent units of over 500,000 units in the United States.

Track listing

Notes
 All tracks are stylized in uppercase. 
  signifies a co-producer
  signifies an additional producer
  signifies a vocal producer 
  signifies an uncredited co-producer

Sample credits
 "Huncho Dreams" contains samples from "In My Feelings" performed by Drake.

Personnel

Performers
 Quavo – primary artist
 21 Savage – featured artist 
 Drake – featured artist 
 Saweetie – featured artist 
 Madonna – featured artist 
 Cardi B – featured artist 
 Takeoff – featured artist 
 Offset – featured artist 
 Lil Baby – featured artist 
 Travis Scott – featured artist 
 Normani – featured artist 
 Davido – featured artist 
 Kid Cudi – featured artist 

Technical
 Colin Leonard – mastering engineer (all tracks)
 Thomas "Tillie" Mann – mixing engineer (tracks 1–12, 15–19)
 Quavo – recording engineer (tracks 1–6, 8–15, 16–17, 19)
 Mike Dean – mixing engineer (track 13)
 Leslie Brathwaite – mixing engineer (track 14)
 Tim Mclain – recording engineer (track 17)
 Nagaris Johnson – assistant recording engineer (track 17)
 John "Kash" Brown – assistant recording engineer (track 17)
 Princeston "Perfect Harmany" Terry – assistant mixer (tracks 1–6, 8–15, 16–17, 19)
 DJ Durel – assistant mixer (tracks 7, 15, 18)

Production
 30 Roc – producer 
 Cubeatz – producer 
 Buddah Bless – producer 
 Murda Beatz – producer 
 Smokescreen – producer  
 Nas Moore – additional producer 
 Wheezy – producer 
 Keyyz – producer 
 Budda Beats – producer 
 Tay Keith – producer 
 Sool Got Hits – additional producer 
 OG Parker – producer 
 Tee Romano – producer 
 Quavo – co-producer , producer 
 Dun Deal – producer 
 Earl the Pearll – producer 
 Jaded– producer 
 Vance Burdge– producer 
 Ikaz Boi – producer 
 Wondagurl – producer 
 Pharrell Williams – producer 
 Chriz Beatz – additional producer 
 G Koop – producer 
 French Montana – additional producer 
 Tayla Parx – vocal producer 
 Victoria Monét – vocal producer 
 Smith Bros. – additional producer 
 Joseph Davinci – producer 
 Mike Almighty – producer 
 Kid Cudi – producer 

Additional personnel
 Mihailo Andic – artwork

Charts

Weekly charts

Year-end charts

Certifications

Release history

References

2018 debut albums
Quavo albums
Capitol Records albums
Motown albums
Quality Control Music albums
Albums produced by Cubeatz
Albums produced by Murda Beatz
Albums produced by Pharrell Williams
Albums produced by Tay Keith
Albums produced by WondaGurl
Albums produced by Travis Scott
Albums produced by Kid Cudi
Albums produced by Wheezy
Albums produced by OG Parker